Joe Krown is an American keyboardist, based in New Orleans, Louisiana.  He is currently touring all over the U.S. and the world as the organ/piano player for the multi award winning, chart topping Kenny Wayne Shepherd band. He is a New Orleans styled piano and Hammond B3 player. He is a Hammond endorsed artist and is part of the Hammond artist family. Joe's played at the New Orleans Jazz and Heritage Festival as a feature artist every year since 2001 and the French Quarter Festival every year since 1998. He has been nominated twice and won a 2000 New Orleans Big Easy Award in the Blues category. His trio with Johnny Sansone & John Fohl has also won a 2004 New Orleans Big Easy Award in the Blues category. His Hammond organ trio featuring Louisiana guitarist Walter “Wolfman” Washington won a 2009 New Orleans Big Easy Award in the Blues Category and a 2009 OffBeat Award for Best R&B/Funk Album. In April 2014, he was honored with a Piano Legacy Award, presented by the New Orleans Jazz Orchestra and for being a "Master of Piano".

Biography

Early years
Krown was raised in Westbury, Long Island, New York. He started playing piano in his childhood. While attending the State University of New York at Buffalo, he discovered the Hammond organ, and soon left the University to pursue career as a professional musician.

In the 1980s, Krown relocated to Boston, formed his own band with his then wife and played around New York and New England. During this time he joined Chuck Berry's back up band featuring Nashville producer Tom Hambridge on drums and toured with him on the East Coast. They also backed up 1950s doo-wop acts such as the Platters, Marvellettes and the Drifters.

Krown joined ex-Muddy Waters guitarist Luther "Guitar Junior" Johnson's band in the late 1980s. He toured nationally and internationally and recorded two albums with Johnson during his tenure with his band.

With Clarence "Gatemouth" Brown
In 1991, Krown moved to New Orleans to join Gatemouth's band, Gate's Express. From then on he held the keyboard chair of the band until Gatemouth's death in 2005. Krown recorded four albums with him, and toured across U.S. and overseas. In 1995, Gatemouth was chosen as an opening act for Eric Clapton's world tour, and Krown toured with him as a member of the band.

Solo career
In 1998 he debuted as a solo artist. He released Just the Piano...Just the Blues on STR Digital Records. It was a piano solo album in strictly traditional blues and boogie woogie style.

The Joe Krown Organ Combo was formed in 1999. The Joe Krown Organ Combo performed every week at one of the many New Orleans nightclubs, including the Maple Leaf Bar, House of Blues, Tipitina's, Le Bon Temps Roule and dba. The "Combo" makes regular appearances at the French Quarter Festival in New Orleans and the New Orleans Jazz & Heritage Festival. The band made its European debut in November 2001 at the Ingolstadt Jazztage in Ingolstadt Germany. The Joe Krown Organ Combo has four CD releases. Down & Dirty (1999), Buckle Up (2000) and Funk Yard (2002) were all released on the New Orleans label STR Digital. The Joe Krown Organ Combo’s latest release, Livin' Large was released in February 2005 and is Krown's first self-produced, independently released CD (JK1001).

Apart from the Organ Combo, Krown started to play with guitarist John Fohl and harmonica/accordion player Johnny Sansone in 2000. They played traditional blues with Krown on piano, and Fohl and Sansone sharing the vocal duties. This trio Sansone, Krown & Fohl released a self-titled album from Sansone's label ShortStack Records in 2004.

Krown has two solo piano CDs on the New Orleans label STR Digital. Just the Piano...Just the Blues (1998) and New Orleans Piano Rolls (2003). Both are solo piano performance featuring original New Orleans piano/boogie-woogie style compositions and classic New Orleans piano songs. His current solo piano CD, Exposed (JK1005) is the follow-up to the STR Digital CDs. He has been a headline performer at WWOZ's Piano Night during the New Orleans Jazz & Heritage Festival every year since 1997. Krown plays regular solo piano performances in New Orleans at Ralph's on the Park, Le Bon Temps and the Jazz Playhouse in the Sonesta Hotel on Bourbbon St. In October 2005, after Hurricane Katrina and the failures of the federal levee systems destroyed Krown's home city of New Orleans, he returned home and started playing around New Orleans with his piano trio, the Joe Krown Trio. In March 2007, Krown released his eighth album, Old Friends (JK1002) featuring the trio.

In the spring of 2007, Krown started playing every Sunday night at the Maple Leaf Bar (New Orleans, LA) with Walter "Wolfman" Washington (guitar & vocals) and Russell Batiste, Jr. (drums). It features Krown playing Hammond B-3 organ where he plays all the bass parts on the organ. The Sunday nights were so successful that the trio released a live CD, Live at the Maple Leaf (JK1003) in Oct. 2008. Live at the Maple Bar was produced by Krown and will be the first live CD in his catalogue. Live at the Maple Bar won a 2009 Offbeat Award for Best R&B/Funk CD. The trio also won a 2009 Big Easy Award in the "Best Rhythm & Blues Band" category. In the fall of 2010, the Trio released Triple Threat (JK1004), the follow up to Live at the Maple Leaf Bar and their first studio CD. The trio released its third album, Soul Understanding (JK1006) for Jazz Fest 2013. The Trio was invited to be part of 15 city U.S. tour called "New Orleans Nights" (November 2010). The band was a feature along with Nicholas Payton and Allen Toussaint. In the fall of 2017 Russell Batiste, Jr. left the Trio and Wayne Maureau took over the drum chair.

After the death of Allen Toussaint in November 2015, Krown was selected to fill the maestro's chair by playing piano with Toussaint's band backing  Bonnie Raitt, Aaron Neville, Irma Thomas, Dr. John, Cyril Neville and more at the 2016 New Orleans Jazz Fest, Hollwood Bowl, Midsummer Night Swing at Lincoln Center and more.

In May 2017 ,in addition to being a headline performer for the 29th annual WWOZ Piano Night at the New Orleans House of Blues during the 2017 New Orleans Jazz and Heritage Festival, Krown was selected to be the producer for the event. As producer, he put together a show featuring 10 of the best local New Orleans piano players. The 2017 WWOZ Piano Night was so successful that he was named the permanent producer of the WWOZ Piano Night. The 2018 WWOZ Piano Night was even more successful with a sell-out show.

Krown made his acting debut in the HBO series Treme. He did a scene in Season 1, episode 4; "At the Foot of Canal Street" (air date 5/2/10) and Season 3, episode 5; "I Thought I Heard Buddy Bolden Say" (air date 10/21/12). He also has music from some of his CDs featured on the show. "Moore Women Shuffle" (from Piano Rolls) was featured in "Meet De Boys on the Battlefront" (air date 4/18/10) and "All That and Then Some" (from Exposed) was in "I Thought I Heard Buddy Bolden Say" (air date 10/21/12). Krown can also be seen in several episodes of the TNT series Memphis Beat and the De Niro/Stallone movie Grudge Match (2013).

With Kenny Wayne Shepherd
In June 2017 Krown joined the Kenny Wayne Shepherd Band as the full time keyboard player. The band has been nominated five times for a Grammy Award, has received two Billboard Music Awards, two Blues Music Awards and two Orville H. Gibson Awards. The band has had three platinum (1 million sold) selling CDs and ine gold (500,000 sold) selling CD. The band is a headline act on the modern blues scene, has made appearances on late night TV and has been an opening act for such major acts as Van Halen, the Rolling Stones, Bob Dylan, Aerosmith and Lynyrd Skynyrd.

Discography

Albums as leader
 1997: Just The Piano...Just The Blues (STR Digital 9703)  solo piano
 1999: Down & Dirty (STR Digital 9902) Organ Combo
 2000: Buckle Up (STR Digital 1002) Organ Combo 
 2002: Funk Yard (STR Digital 1007) Organ Combo
 2003: New Orleans Piano Rolls (STR Digital 1012) solo piano
 2004: Sansone, Krown & Fohl (ShortStack 7905)
 2005: Livin' Large (Joe Krown JK1001) Organ Combo
 2007: Old Friends (Joe Krown JK1002)  Piano Trio
 2008: Live at the Maple Leaf (Joe Krown JK1003) with Walter "Wolfman" Washington & Russell Batiste Jr.
 2010: Triple Threat (Joe Krown JK1004) with Walter "Wolfman" Washington & Russell Batiste Jr.
 2012: Exposed (Joe Krown JK1005) solo piano
 2013: Soul Understanding (Joe Krown JK1006) with Walter "Wolfman" Washington & Russell Batiste Jr.

With Luther "Guitar Junior" Johnson
1990: I Want to Groove with You (Bullseye Blues/Rounder)
1992: It's Good to Me (Bullseye Blues/Rounder)

With Clarence "Gatemouth" Brown
 1994: The Man (Verve/Gitanes)
 1997: Gate Swings (Verve/Gitanes)
 1999: American Music, Texas Style (Blue Thumb/Verve)
 2001: Back to Bogalusa (Blue Thumb/Verve)
 2003: Clarence "Gatemouth" Brown in Concert (in-akustik --- DVD)
 2006: Carlos Santana Presents Blues at Montreux 2004 (RED Distribution --- DVD)

Other works
 1998: Bobby Charles: Secret of the Heart (Stony Plain)
 2000: Kid Ramos: West Coast House Party (Evidence)
 2003: Mathilda Jones: There's Something Inside Me and It's Called the Blues (Southland)
 2003: various: Patchwork - A Tribute to James Booker (STR Digital)
 2004: Amanda Shaw: I'm Not A Bubble Gum Pop Princess (Little Fiddle)
 2004: Bobby Charles: Last Train to Memphis (Rice 'n' Gravy)
 2005: Juice: Hey Buddy (DJR)
 2008: Bobby Charles: Homemade Songs (Rice 'n' Gravy)
 2011: Zigaboo Modeliste: New Life (JZM)
 Kenny Wayne Shepherd (2017) The Traveler (Concord Records)

References

External links

Official website
Le Show interview & performance: 

Year of birth missing (living people)
Living people
American blues pianists
American male pianists
American organists
American male organists
Rhythm and blues musicians from New Orleans
Blues musicians from New Orleans
People from Westbury, New York
21st-century American pianists
21st-century organists
21st-century American male musicians
21st-century American keyboardists
20th-century American keyboardists
20th-century American male musicians